The Nalbari Assembly constituency (নলবাৰী বিধান সভা সমষ্টি) is number 59 out of 126 in the Assam Legislative Assembly. This seat is a mix of urban and rural voters as well. The assembly constituency comes under the Mangoldoi Lok Sabha constituency. The Convenor, Sh. Manash Deka Bharatiya Janata Party for North East, Delhi Pradesh did school education in this assembly constituency.

Members of Legislative Assembly 
 1978: Narendra Nath Dutta, Communist Party of India (Marxist)
 1983: Chandradhar Kalita, Independent
 1985: Nagen Sarma, Independent
 1991: Nagen Sarma, Asom Gana Parishad
 1996: Nagen Sarma, Asom Gana Parishad
 2000: Alaka Sarma, Asom Gana Parishad
 2001: Madan Kalita, Indian National Congress
 2006: Alaka Sarma, Asom Gana Parishad
 2011: Jayanta Malla Baruah, Indian National Congress
 2016: Ashok Sarma, Bhartiya Janata Party
 2021:Jayanta Malla Baruah, Bhartiya Janata Party

Election results

2021 result

2016 Election

2011 result

2006 result

External links 
 

Assembly constituencies of Assam